Muradiye is a town and district in the Van Province of Turkey.

History

The tenth-century Byzantine text De Administrando Imperio mentions "Perkri" belonging to King Ashot I Bagratuni at the beginning of the ninth century before being turned over to an Arab ruler, Abu'l-Ward. After the death of Ashot's son, Smbat I, another Arab ruler, Abu Sawada, took possession of Berkri.

Forced evacuations 
The Muradiye district also experienced forced evacuations of some of its inhabitants as a consequence of the Turkish-Kurdish conflict.

Government 
Mehmet Ali Tunç was elected mayor in the local elections 2014. He was detained and a trustee was appointed instead in January 2017. In the local elections in March 2019, Yılmaz Şalan from the Peoples' Democratic Party (HDP) was elected mayor in the local elections. On the 6 November 2019, Şalan was arrested due to charges relating to terrorism. The current Kaymakam is Erkan Savar.

Education 
In the early 2000s, there was reported a lack of teachers. Teachers were teaching more than 50 children per average.

Earthquake 
In 1976 an earthquake occurred in Muradiye, Van and caused the death of about 3640 people and leaving 51'000 people homeless.

See also
1976 Çaldıran–Muradiye earthquake

References

Populated places in Van Province
Districts of Van Province
Kurdish settlements in Turkey